Provincial elections were held in Sindh, Pakistan along with general elections, for National Assembly and all Provincial Assemblies, on 16 November.

List of members of the 8th Provincial Assembly of Sindh 
Tenure of the 8th Provincial assembly of Sindh was from 19 November 1988 till 6 May 1990.

References 

Provincial Assembly of Sindh
Politics of Sindh
1988 elections in Pakistan